Dubai Shopping Festival (DSF) is an annual month long event put together by the Dubai Festivals & Retail Establishment (DFRE), which is a part of Dubai's department of tourism. During the festival, shops offer discounts on their merchandise, daily car raffles and prize drawings are held to win items such as gold and cars, and there is a fireworks display. There are also a range of family activities and live shows that take place throughout Dubai.

History 
The Festival first began on 16 February 1996 and took a total of 45 days to construct before launching. The idea for the festival was first created by Sheikh Mohammad Bin Rashid Al Maktoum. The year 2019 is its 24th year of operation. The 24th edition of the Dubai Shopping Festival from 2018 to 2019 will take place for over five weeks, which marks the longest period of time that the festival has run so far. "One World, One Family, One Festival" is the motto for the Dubai Shopping Festival.

Economic growth 

The festival was originally constructed to attract increases in the retail trade industry in Dubai, United Arab Emirates, but was later promoted as a tourist attraction. The first Dubai Shopping Festival in 1996 attracted more than one and a half million people who spent over of 500 million dollars during the one month event. These statistics have since grown, with more than three million people attending the festival and over 2 billion dollars being earned at the Dubai Shopping Festival in 2009. The Festival industry has been a big contributor in Dubai's economy, helping to stimulate tourism and the retail market.  In the most recent festival from 2018 to 2019, over 700 brand names and 3000 stores will have participated.

News 
Multiple world records have been set in Dubai during the Dubai Shopping Festival. In 1999, the world's longest gold chain and sofa as well as the biggest chair, stationary bicycle, and mattress were shown at the festival. In 2001, the largest incense burner, shopping bag, and bowl of biriyani were displayed at the festival. In 2002, the largest entry visa in size was issued, along with the showcase of the largest magazine and box of chocolates. In 2004, the largest shopping cart and calendar, as well as the longest buffet were displayed. In 2006, the festival was postponed, and later cancelled due to the death of Dubai's ruler, sheikh Maktoum bin Rashid Al Maktoum. In 2013, Dubai Metro held the first fashion show that took place on a moving train as a part of the DSF festivities.

See also
UAE Awafi Festival
Mall of the Emirates
Global Village
Jumeirah Beach

References

External links

Shopping festivals
Festivals in the United Arab Emirates
Shopping Festival
Shopping Festival
Annual events in the United Arab Emirates
Festivals established in 1995
1995 establishments in the United Arab Emirates